Kane Elliot Mark Russell (born 22 April 1992) is a New Zealand field hockey player who plays as a defender for German club Hamburger Polo Club and the New Zealand national team.

Russell represented his country at the 2016 Summer Olympics in Rio de Janeiro, where the men's team came seventh.

Club career
Russell plays as a defender for the Southern region in the New Zealand Hockey League. In 2016 he joined Royal Antwerp in Belgium. After one season with Antwerp he left them for Léopold. In the 2018–19 season he won the Belgian national title with Léopold. After he won the national title, he left Léopold and joined Rotterdam in the Netherlands. In April 2020, it was announced he left Rotterdam together with Blair Tarrant for Hamburger Polo Club in Germany for the 2020–21 season.

Personal life 
Russell was born in Dunedin in 1992. Of Māori descent, Russell affiliates to the Ngāpuhi iwi.

References

External links

1992 births
Living people
Ngāpuhi people
New Zealand Māori sportspeople
Sportspeople from Dunedin
Olympic field hockey players of New Zealand
New Zealand male field hockey players
2014 Men's Hockey World Cup players
Field hockey players at the 2016 Summer Olympics
Field hockey players at the 2020 Summer Olympics
Field hockey players at the 2018 Commonwealth Games
Field hockey players at the 2022 Commonwealth Games
2018 Men's Hockey World Cup players
Commonwealth Games silver medallists for New Zealand
Commonwealth Games medallists in field hockey
Male field hockey defenders
HC Rotterdam players
Men's Hoofdklasse Hockey players
Men's Belgian Hockey League players
Royal Léopold Club players
2023 Men's FIH Hockey World Cup players
New Zealand expatriate sportspeople in Germany
Medallists at the 2018 Commonwealth Games